Ghordi Khas is a village located in Udhampur district, Jammu and Kashmir, India.

Demographics 
According to the 2011 Census of India, Ghordi Khas village has a total population of 4,649 people including 2,428 males and 2,221 females; and has a literacy rate of 54.70%.

References 

Villages in Udhampur district